Aleksandr Yuryevich Podbeltsev (born 15 March 1993) is a Russian football forward who plays for FC Amkar Perm.

Club career
He made his debut in the Russian Professional Football League for FC SKVO Rostov-on-Don on 10 April 2014 in a game against FC MITOS Novocherkassk.

He made his Russian Football National League debut for FC Baltika Kaliningrad on 11 July 2016 in a game against FC Shinnik Yaroslavl.

References

External links
 
 

1993 births
People from Rostov Oblast
Living people
Russian footballers
Association football forwards
FC SKA Rostov-on-Don players
FC Baltika Kaliningrad players
FC Fakel Voronezh players
FC Chayka Peschanokopskoye players
FC Sokol Saratov players
FC Amkar Perm players
Russian First League players
Russian Second League players
Sportspeople from Rostov Oblast